The 2022 NCAA Bowling Championship was the 18th edition of the NCAA Bowling Championship, the annual tournament to determine the national champion of women's NCAA collegiate ten-pin bowling. The finals were hosted by the Mid-American Conference and played at Wayne Webb's Columbus Bowl in Columbus, Ohio from April 15–16, 2022.

Format
The 2022 championship continued the 16-team format that debuted in the 2021 tournament. However, whereas the 2021 regionals were also contested at the championship site, the 2022 regionals took place at four pre-determined locations:

 Arlington, Texas
 Erie, Pennsylvania
 Lansing, Michigan
 Rochester, New York

Each regional was played as a double-elimination tournament. All regional matches, except for what the NCAA calls "if necessary regional finals", were best-of-three matches bowled in the following order: five-person team, Baker total pinfall, Baker best-of-seven match play. Any "if necessary regional final" was Baker best-of-seven. Regional winners advanced to the championship event, which was also double-elimination. All matches were bowled under the standard format for regionals (best-of-three matches using specified formats in a specific order) except the championship final, which was Baker best-of-seven.

Qualification
Since there is only one national collegiate championship for women's bowling, all NCAA bowling programs (whether from Division I, Division II, or Division III) were eligible. A total of 16 teams competed in the double-elimination tournament, with eight conference champions receiving automatic bids and eight teams receiving at-large bids. The teams were revealed in a selection show on March 30, 2022.

Bids
There were 16 teams selected to the tournament - eight were selected automatically as conference champions, while another eight were selected at-large. The top four teams in the tournament were seeded and assigned to separate regions; they were the only teams seeded for this tournament

The Southland Bowling League (SBL) had the most bids of any conference with six, while the Northeast Conference (NEC) had three. The Allegheny Mountain Collegiate Conference (AMCC), Central Intercollegiate Athletic Association (CIAA), East Coast Conference (ECC), Great Lakes Valley Conference (GLVC), Mid-Eastern Athletic Conference (MEAC), Southwestern Athletic Conference (SWAC) sent only their conference tournament champions. Additionally, one independent team received an at-large bid to the tournament.

Tournament bracket
All regions were double-elimination, except for the finals, which was double-elimination before a single Baker best-of-7 championship match.

Erie Regional

Arlington Regional

Rochester Regional

Lansing Regional

Finals

References

NCAA Bowling Championship
2022 in American sports
2022 in bowling
2022 in sports in Ohio
April 2022 sports events in the United States